Dinsmore Golf Course, located in Staatsburg, New York, is listed as the third-oldest golf course in the United States, according to the New York State Office of Parks, Recreation and Historic Preservation. It was originally created by Hal Purdy in the 1890s as a private, nine-hole course, and was expanded to a full 18 holes in 1962.

In recent decades, the course has been open to the public, and does not have any water hazards. Par is 70. The Dinsmore Golf Course provides nice views of the Hudson River and the Catskill Mountains. The course is also located inside the Ogden Mills & Ruth Livingston Mills State Park.

References

External links 
 Dinsmore Golf course

Sports venues in Dutchess County, New York
Golf clubs and courses in New York (state)
1890s establishments in New York (state)